This article contains a list of Wikipedia articles about politicians in countries outside Iran who are of Iranian origin.

Canada
 Ali Ehsassi – Member of the House of Commons of Canada
 Goldie Ghamari – Member of the Legislative Assembly of Ontario
 Majid Jowhari – Member of the House of Commons
 Amir Khadir – Member of the National Assembly of Quebec
 Reza Moridi – Member of the Legislative Assembly of Ontario
 Michael Parsa – Associate Minister of Housing of Ontario

France
 Pouria Amirshahi - Member of the National Assembly

Germany
 Bijan Djir-Sarai - Member of the Bundestag
 Nargess Eskandari-Grünberg - Mayor of Frankfurt
 Yasmin Fahimi - Member of the Bundestag
 Parsa Marvi - Member of the Bundestag
 Niema Movassat - Member of the Bundestag
 Michaela Noll - Member of the Bundestag
 Omid Nouripour - Leader of Alliance 90/The Greens
 Sahra Wagenknecht - Leader of the Opposition in the Bundestag (2015-2017) and of Die Linke in the Bundestag (2015-2019)

Israel
 Eliezer Avtabi - Member of the Knesset
 Michael Ben-Ari - Member of the Knesset
 Moshe Katsav - President of Israel (2000-2007)
 Shaul Mofaz - Chief of Staff of the Israel Defense Forces (1998-2002), Defence Minister (2002-2006) and Deputy Prime Minister (2006-2009, 2012)

Netherlands
 Ulysse Ellian – Member of the House of Representatives
 Farah Karimi – Member of the House of Representatives

New Zealand
 Golriz Ghahraman – Member of the New Zealand Parliament

Norway
 Masud Gharahkhani – President of the Storting
 Mazyar Keshvari – Member of the Storting

Sweden
 Alireza Akhondi – Member of the Riksdag
 Minoo Akhtarzand – Governor of Jönköping County (2010-2016) and Governor of Västmanland County (2016-present)
 Hanif Bali – Member of the Riksdag
 Nooshi Dadgostar – Leader of the Left Party
 Ali Esbati – Member of the Riksdag
 Shadieh Heydari – Member of the Riksdag
 Reza Khelili Dylami – Member of the Riksdag
 Parisa Liljestrand – Minister of Culture (2022–present)
 Romina Pourmokhtari – Minister for the Environment (2022–present)
 Daniel Riazat – Member of the Riksdag
 Azadeh Rojhan Gustafsson – Member of the Riksdag
 Ardalan Shekarabi – Minister for Public Administration (2014-2019) and Minister for Social Security (2019-2022)
 Maryam Yazdanfar – Member of the Riksdag

United Kingdom
 Haleh Afshar, Baroness Afshar - Member of the House of Lords
 David Alliance, Baron Alliance - Member of the House of Lords
 Seema Kennedy - Conservative MP and Parliamentary Undersecretary

United States

US Congress
 Stephanie Bice – Representative from Oklahoma
 Anna Eshoo – Representative from California

State and territory levels
 Raumesh Akbari – Member of the Tennessee Senate and House of Representatives
 Dalya Attar – Member of the Maryland House of Delegates
 Jimmy Delshad – Mayor of Beverly Hills, California (2007-2008, 2010-2011)
 Anna Eskamani – Member of the Florida House of Representatives
 Darya Farivar – Member-elect of the Washington House of Representatives
 Rey Garofano – Member of the Vermont House of Representatives
 Haraz Ghanbari – Member of the Ohio House of Representatives
 Cyrus Habib – Lieutenant Governor of Washington (2017-2021)
 Anna Kaplan – Member of the New York Senate
 Zahra Karinshak – Member of the Georgia Senate
 Ross Mirkarimi – Sheriff of San Francisco (2012, 2012-2016)
 Adrin Nazarian – Member of the California State Assembly
 Bob Yousefian – Mayor of Glendale, California (2004-2005)

See also 
 List of heads of state and government of Indian origin
 List of foreign politicians of Chinese origin
 List of foreign politicians of Korean origin
 List of foreign politicians of Indian origin
 List of foreign politicians of Japanese origin
 List of foreign politicians of Vietnamese origin

References 

Politicians of Iranian descent
Lists of politicians